Elections to Preston City Council took place on 3 May 2012, the same day as other 2012 United Kingdom local elections.

Preston council is elected "in thirds", which means one councillor from each three-member ward and selected councillors from a number of two-member wards are elected each year, followed by one year free from any elections to ensure all councillors serve a full term.

Two wards will have 'double elections' due to early resignations.

Due to the "in thirds" system, the 2012 election results below are directly compared with the corresponding elections in 2008, with the change in vote share calculated on this basis. Other elections can be found at Preston local elections.

Summary

Ward results

Ashton
Won in corresponding 2008 elections by Conservative Party, majority 113.  Ashton was a Labour gain from the Conservatives at the 2011 elections

Brookfield
Won in corresponding 2008 elections by Conservatives, with a majority of 91. The Brookfield ward is in the north-east of the borough.

Cadley
Won in corresponding 2008 elections by Liberal Democrats, majority 386. When this councillor resigned in 2010, it was held by the Liberal Democrats in the resulting by-election.  Cadley is at the west of the Fulwood area of the borough.

Deepdale
Won in corresponding 2008 elections by an independent candidate, majority 348. Labour won the seat at the 2011 elections.

Fishwick
Won in corresponding 2008 elections by the Labour Party, majority over the Liberal Democrats of 41. The former township lies to the east of the A6 London Road.

Garrison
Won in corresponding 2008 elections by Conservative Party, majority 883. Garrison is in the northeast of the borough, with Fulwood Barracks at its centre.

Greyfriars
Won in corresponding 2008 elections by Conservative Party, majority 1,237. It lies at the north of the Fulwood area, with the M55 motorway at its northern edge, intersected by the West Coast Main Line. The ward is predominantly suburban, and a white population of nearly 95%

Ingol
Won in corresponding 2008 elections by Liberal Democrats, majority 154. Ingol and Tanteron lie in the north of the borough, to the east of the A6 Garstang Road.

Ingol and Tanterton Neighbourhood Council

There were inaugural elections to a 10-member Neighbourhood Council covering the Ingol ward on the same day.  There was 13 candidates, all of whom independent candidates.

Larches
Won in corresponding 2008 elections by Liberal Democrats, majority 384. This ward has been won by the Labour Party in the preceding 2009 and 2010 elections

Lea
Won in corresponding 2008 elections by the Conservative Party, gaining from the Liberal Democrats, with a  majority of 88.  The ward is coterminous with Lea and Cottam civil parish.

Rural East
Preston Rural East is a large rural division won in corresponding 2008  elections by Conservative Party, majority 785. The ward contains the civil parishes of Broughton, Haighton, and Grimsargh.

Rural North
Won in corresponding 2008 elections by Conservative Party, majority 1,628, the ward of Preston Rural North covers the civil parishes of Woodplumpton, Barton, Whittingham, and Goosnargh

Due to the resignation of Councillor Kate Calder the poll for Rural North will be a double vacancy, making direct comparison with the corresponding 2008 election too inaccurate.

Ribbleton
Won in corresponding 2008 elections by Labour Party, majority 381 over the Conservatives. Situated in the east of the borough, Ribbleton extends across to the Red Scar industrial estate in addition to the mix of suburban and terraced communities closer to Preston City Centre. Parts of the division are amongst the most deprived in England

Riversway
Won in corresponding 2008 elections by Labour Party, majority 251. Labour regained the seat in a 2010 by-election.  Riversway contains the former Preston Dock, suburban residential areas and County Hall.

Sharoe Green
Won in corresponding 2008 elections by Conservative Party, majority 787.  This division contains the Royal Preston Hospital.

St George's
Won in corresponding 2008 elections by Labour, majority 173, the ward of St George's consists of terraces off Deepdale Road, some University of Central Lancashire Halls of Residence, and recently built private apartments. The ward has a population which is approximately 65% white and 30% Asian.

Due to the resignation of Councillor Taalib Shamduddin the contest for St George's will be a double vacancy, which makes direct comparison with the corresponding 2008 election inaccurate.

St Matthew's
Won in corresponding 2008 elections by Labour Party, majority 199, the St Matthew's ward contains Preston Prison at the far corner of the ward, at the junction of the A6 London Road.  At the 2001 Census, the ethnic profile of St Matthews was over 70% white, with three areas within the division amongst the 10% most deprived in England

Town Centre
Based on the areas of Avenham, Frenchwood and the City Centre, the ward of Town Centre is the largest non-rural ward in the borough. The 2008 result was a Labour hold, with a majority of 74 over an independent candidate. The ward is over 60% white and almost a third Asian or Asian British

Tulketh
Won in corresponding 2008 elections by Labour Party, majority 54 over the Liberal Democrats, and in a by-election later that year with a majority of 23.

References

 Preston City Council

2012 English local elections
2012
2010s in Lancashire